FC Avangard-Kortek was a Russian football team from Kolomna. It played professionally in 1948–1949, 1960, 1963–1969 and 1992–1996. Their best result was 9th place in Zone 1 of the second-highest Soviet First League in 1948 (it played on that level in 1948–1949 and 1960). In 1997, it merged with FC Oka to form FC Kolomna.

Team name history
 1906–? FC KGO Kolomna
 ?-1937 FC Dzerzhinets Kolomna
 1938–1947 FC Zenit Kolomna
 1948–1959 FC Dzerzhinets Kolomna
 1960–1992 FC Avangard Kolomna
 1993 FC Viktor-Avangard Kolomna
 1994–1996 FC Avangard-Kortek Kolomna

External links
  Team history at KLISF

Association football clubs established in 1906
Association football clubs disestablished in 1997
Defunct football clubs in Russia
Football in Moscow Oblast
1906 establishments in the Russian Empire
1997 disestablishments in Russia